Cyphocoleus is a genus of beetles in the family Carabidae, containing 22 species.

References

External links
 iNaturalist

Platyninae